Engin Hepileri (born 3 March 1978) is a Turkish actor and theatre director.

He is best known for hit military comedy "Emret Komutanım", youth series "Kampüsistan" and İntikam adaptation of Revenge. He portrayed singer Kazım Koyuncu and played in many festival films. He also had guest roles in many hit series "Yılan Hikayesi", "Yedi Numara", "Gece Gündüz", "Bu Kalp Seni Unutur Mu", "Yaprak Dökümü", "Hürrem Sultan", "Gönül Çelen", "Kızlar Yurdu".

After joining the cast of Kent Oyuncuları on stage, he started to appear in various theatre plays. In 2008 he started working as a theatre director. He also briefly worked as a TV presenter on TRT 1, presenting the Altın Petek TV program.

Career 
Hepileri had his first experience on stage while being a student at Cağaloğlu Anadolu Lisesi, and in 1996 he enrolled in the Istanbul University State Conservatory. In 2002, he started studying for a master's degree in acting in the same institution and worked there as a research assistant until 2005.

While in high school, he appeared in four plays organized by the Turkish State Theatres. In 1998, he was cast in the Anlat Şehrazat musical and later played a character in the play Ölümsüzler at Theatre Fora. In the same year, he joined the cast of Kent Oyuncuları and appeared in 20 plays organized by this company. Meanwhile, he started to pursue a career in cinema and television.

In 2008, he began directing theatre plays and worked as a faculty member for Istanbul University and Academy Kenter. Between 2011–2012, he presented a culture-art themed program during weekdays on TRT Okul channel.

Filmography

Film 
 Gülüm (2002)
 Beyza'nın Kadınları (2005) - Hüseyin
 Gelin (2006)
 Başımın Belası (2007)
 Şöhretin Bedeli (2007)
 Son Ders: Aşk ve Üniversite (2007) - Hakan/Saffet
 İdam (2007)
 Nefes (2009) 
 Başımın Belası (2010) - Onur Öztürk
 Av Mevsimi (2010) - Asiye's boss
 Tek Ölüm Yetmez Kısa Film (2011) - Cem
 Celal Tan ve Ailesinin Aşırı Acıklı Hikayesi (2011) - Deputy Commissioner Arkibiyades
 Ferahfeza (2012) - Sex shop owner
 Bana Adını Sor (2014) - Hakan
 Çalsın Sazlar (2014)
 Yağmur: Kıyamet Çiçeği (2014) - Kazım Koyuncu
 Anka (2022)
 Tamirhane (2022) - Gürdal
 Prestij Meselesi (2023) - 

 TV series 
 İki Arkadaş (1998) - Rıza
 Yılan Hikayesi (2000) - Police
 Yedi Numara (2000)
 Beşik Kertmesi (2002)
 Canım Kocacığım (2002)
 Hürrem Sultan (2003) - Şehzade Cihangir
 Kampüsistan (2003) - Oğuz
 Emret Komutanım (2005) - Senor Seyfi
 Kızlar Yurdu (2006) - Çavuş Seyfi Sarsılmaz
 Çemberin Dışında (2007) - Kıvanç ÖzyurtYasak Elma (2007) - Teoman
 Gece Gündüz (2008) - Police Tekin
 Aile Saadeti (2009) - Mahir
 Bu Kalp Seni Unutur Mu? (2009) - Engin Doğan
 Yaprak Dökümü (2009) - Waiter Emir
 Küstüm Çiçeği (2010) - Semih
 Gönülçelen (2010) - Burhan's youth
 Koyu Kırmızı  (2012) - Ufuk
 İntikam (2013–2014) - Hakan Eren
 Kara Ekmek (2015) - Taylan
 Kimse Bilmez (2019) - Uygar Sarıkaya
 Doğduğun Ev Kaderindir (2019–2020) - Faruk
 Evlilik Hakkında Her Şey (2021) - Koray
 Midnight at the Pera Palace (2022) - Reşat

 Music videos 
 Mor ve Ötesi - "Son Giden" (2001) 
 Gökhan Türkmen - "Bir Öykü" (2014)
 Nilüfer - "Seni Kimler Aldı" (2017)

 TV programs 
 Altın Petek (2016)

 Awards 
 2004 - 8th Afife Theatre Awards, "New Generation Special Award in Theater"
 2010 - 15th Sadri Alışık Acting Awards, "Best Actor in a Supporting Role in Theater Comedy"
 2011 - 18th Adana Golden Boll Awards, "Jury Special Collective Performance Award (shared with the cast)"
 2015 - 20th Sadri Alışık Cinema Awards, "Ayhan Işık Special Award" (Çalsın Sazlar/Yağmur: Kıyamet Çiçeği'')

References

External links 
 
 

1978 births
Turkish male stage actors
Turkish male film actors
Turkish theatre directors
Turkish male television actors
Living people
Cağaloğlu Anadolu Lisesi alumni